Nancy Cassis (born January 26, 1944) is an American teacher and psychologist.  As a Michigan Senator who initially ran against Dick DeVos, she dropped out of the contest before Michigan's 2006 gubernatorial Republican primary.  In the Michigan Senate she served as the Majority Caucus Chairperson and introduced the Michigan Business Tax, which was eventually repealed by conservative governor Rick Snyder.

Cassis is a Novi resident who represented the 15th district.
She has a B.A. from Ohio University, where she graduated summa cum laude and Phi Beta Kappa.  She earned her M.S. and Ed.S. degrees from the University of Michigan in Ann Arbor, Michigan.  The Senator was a teacher from 1966 to 1968 for the Ohio Public Schools. She also was a psychologist for the Novi Community Schools from 1980 to 1996.

Nancy Cassis waged an unsuccessful write-in campaign to be the Republican nominee for the United States House of Representatives in District 11.  Incumbent Thad McCotter was ineligible due to forged signatures. Cassis had pledged to spend at least 200,000 dollars in order to defeat balloted candidate Kerry Bentivolio in the Republican primary. Some Cassis supporters had doubts that Bentivolio would win the general election, while some Bentivolio supporters viewed the Cassis write-in campaign as an effort by establishment Republicans to block the election of a conservative.  Bentivolio was elected to Congress.

References

External links
Campaign Site 2012 Congressional Campaign
Senator Nancy Cassis Web page
Profile of Casis
Senator Cassis at photo-ops
Michigan Senate Majority Caucus page
Profile with Michigan Political Leadership Program 

1944 births
Living people
Republican Party members of the Michigan House of Representatives
Republican Party Michigan state senators
Women state legislators in Michigan
Ohio University alumni
University of Michigan School of Education alumni
20th-century American politicians
21st-century American politicians
20th-century American women politicians
21st-century American women politicians